Mauricio Pozo may refer to:

Mauricio Pozo Crespo (born 1959), Ecuadorian economist and politician
Mauricio Pozo Quinteros (born 1970), Chilean football manager